Late Night Double Feature is a Canadian horror anthology film which premiered at the 2014 New York City Horror Film Festival. The film was picked up for distribution by Parade Deck Films in North America.

Summary
During a late night taping of Dr. Nasty's Cavalcade of Horror, bloody chaos takes place while screening two features (Dinner for Monsters and Slit). Samantha/Nurse Nasty is frustrated with how the show is being run by its womanizing director and its drunk and crazy host, Dr. Nasty.

Reception
Late Night Double Feature won "Best in Horror" at the 2015 Hot Springs International Horror Film Festival. The film received a 3 out of 4 rating from Fangoria.

References

2014 films
Canadian horror anthology films
English-language Canadian films
2010s Canadian films